Simpson is an English/Scottish patronymic surname from the medieval masculine given name 'Simme', a medieval variant of 'Simon'. The earliest public record of the name was in 1353 in Staffordshire, West Midlands region of England.

Notable surnames

A 
 Aaron Simpson (disambiguation), several people
 Aaron Simpson (producer) (born 1971), American animation producer
 Aaron Simpson (entrepreneur) (born 1972), British businessman
 Aaron Simpson (fighter) (born 1974), American mixed martial artist
 Adam Simpson (born 1976), Australian rules footballer
 Adele Simpson (1903–1995), American child performer and fashion designer
 Adrian Simpson (born 1971), British TV presenter
 Adrienne Simpson (1943–2010), New Zealand broadcaster, historian, musicologist and writer
 Al Simpson (1916–1976), American football coach
 Alan Simpson (disambiguation), several people
 Albert Benjamin Simpson (1843–1919), Canadian evangelist
 Alex Simpson (1924–2008), Scottish soccer player
 Alexander Simpson (disambiguation), several people
 A. W. B. Simpson (Alfred, 1931–2011), British legal historian
 Alfred Allen Simpson (1875–1939), South Australian industrialist
 Alfred Edward Simpson (1868–1940), South Australian architect
 Alfred Muller Simpson (1843–1917), South Australian industrialist
 Allan Simpson (born 1977), baseball player
 Alli Simpson (born 1998), Australian singer. 
 Amanda Simpson (born 1961), American civil servant
 Andrew Simpson (disambiguation), several people
 Andrew Simpson (animal trainer) (born 1966/1967), Scottish animal trainer
 Andrew Simpson (sailor) (1976–2013), British sailor
 Andrew Simpson (actor) (born 1989), Irish actor
 Andrew Clive Simpson, British computer scientist
 Ann Marie Simpson (born 1980), American violinist
 Anna Simpson (born 1985), American actress and singer
 Anne Simpson (born 1956), Canadian poet
 Ant Simpson (born 19??), Australian radio host, TV presenter and voiceover artist
 Anthony Simpson (1935–2022), British MEP
 Archibald Simpson (1790–1847), Scottish architect
 Archibald Henry Simpson (1843–1918), Australian judge
 Archie Simpson (1866–1955), Scottish golfer, golf course designer and club maker
 Arnold Simpson (born 1952), American politician in Kentucky
 Ashlee Simpson, American pop singer; sister of Jessica Simpson

B 
 Bart Simpson (filmmaker) (born 19??), Canadian producer and director
 Becky Simpson (born 1986), British actress, writer and musician
 Ben Simpson (1878–1964), Canadian football player
 Bill and Billy Simpson (disambiguation), multiple people
 Bill Simpson (actor) (1931–1986), Scottish actor
 Bill Simpson (1940–2019), American racecar driver and founder of Simpson Performance Products
 Bill Simpson (American football) (born 1951), American football defensive backer
 Billy Simpson (footballer, born 1878) (1878–1962), English football player for Sunderland and Lincoln City
 Billy Simpson (singer) (born 1987), Indonesian singer-songwriter
 Bob and Bobby Simpson (disambiguation), multiple people
 Bob R. Simpson, American business executive, Major League Baseball Texas Rangers co-owner
 Bob Simpson (Canadian football) (1930–2007), CFL football player
 Bob Simpson (cricketer) (born 1936), Australian cricketer
 Bob Simpson (journalist) (1944–2006), foreign correspondent for the BBC
 Bob Simpson (British Columbia politician) (born 1956 or 1957), member of Legislative Assembly of British Columbia
 Bobby Simpson (ice hockey) (born 1956), Canadian NHL ice hockey player
 Brandon Simpson (born 1981), American sprinter who represents Bahrain
 Brett Simpson (born 1985), American surfer
 Brian Simpson (born 1953), British member of the European Parliament
 Britney Simpson (born 1996), American pair skater
 Bruce Simpson (athlete) (born 1950), Canadian pole vaulter
 Bruce Simpson (blogger) (born 19??), New Zealand blogger

C 
 Cam Simpson (born 19??), American journalist
 Carl Simpson (born 1970), American footballer
 Carlos Simpson (born 1962), American mathematician
 Carole Simpson (born 1941), American news presenter and author
 Cather Simpson, New Zealand chemistry and physics professor
 Charles and Charlie Simpson (disambiguation), multiple people
 Charles Torrey Simpson (1846–1932), American biologist
 Charles Walter Simpson (Canadian artist) (1878–1942), Canadian artist and illustrator
 Charles Walter Simpson (English artist) (1885–1971), English painter
 Charles Ralph Simpson III (born 1945), United States federal judge
 Charlie Simpson (footballer) (1861–1???), English soccer player
 Charlie Simpson, English singer of the British rock bands Fightstar and Busted
 Charlie Simpson (fundraiser), 7-y.o. British Haiti earthquake relief fundraiser
 Chris Simpson (disambiguation), Chris, Christine and Christopher Simpson, multiple people
 Chris Simpson (cricketer) (born 1982), Australian cricketer 
 Chris Simpson (squash player) (born 1987), British squash player
 Christine Simpson (born 1964), Canadian television presenter
 Christopher Simpson (c.1604–1669), English composer and musician
 Christopher Simpson (actor) (born 1975), Irish actor
 Claire Simpson (born 19??), British film editor
 Cleave Simpson, American politician
 Clement Pearson Simpson (1868–1948), English rugby union player
 Cody Simpson (born 1997), Australian singer
 Colin Simpson (disambiguation), multiple people
 Colin Hall Simpson (1894–1964), Australian general
 Colin M. Simpson (born 1959), American politician
 Colin Simpson (author) (born 19??), Canadian software developer and author of textbooks
 Coreen Simpson (born 1942), American photographer and jewelry designer
 Corelli C. W. Simpson (1837–1???), American poet, cookbook author, painter
 Craig Simpson (born 1967), Canadian ice hockey player
 Craig Simpson (footballer) (born 19??), New Zealand international football (soccer) player
 Cuthbert Simpson (1892–1969), Anglican Dean of Christchurch, Oxford, 1959–1969

D 
 Dana Simpson (born 1977), cartoonist
 Daniel and Danny Simpson (disambiguation), multiple people
 Daniel H. Simpson (1927–2015), American diplomat
 Daniel R. Simpson (born 1939), American politician
 Danny Simpson (early footballer) (fl. 1896–1903), an English footballer
 Danny Simpson (born 1987), English footballer
 Darren Simpson (born 1978), South African radio presenter
 David Simpson (disambiguation), several people
 Dave Simpson (ice hockey) (born 1962), Canadian ice hockey player
 Dave Simpson (soccer) (born 1983), Canadian soccer player
 David Simpson (priest) (1745–1799), English priest
 David Simpson (Canadian politician) (1911–1965), Canadian politician
 David Simpson (artist) (born 1928), American artist
 David Simpson (Northern Ireland politician) (born 1959), Democratic Unionist Party  politician in Northern Ireland
 David Simpson (Texas politician) (born 1961), Texas Representative
 David Simpson (cricketer) (born 1983), Irish cricketer
 Dawson Simpson (born 1989), Australian rules footballer
 Dean Simpson (born 1950), American politician and businessman in Minnesota
 Deborah Simpson (born 19??), American politician in Maine
 Dennis Simpson (1919–2002), English footballer
 Derek Simpson (cellist) (1928–2007), English cellist
 Derek Simpson (trade unionist) (born 1944), British trade union leader
 Diamon Simpson (born 1987), American player in the Israel Basketball Premier League
 Dick Simpson (born 1943), American baseball player
 Dillon Simpson (born 1993), Canadian ice hockey player
 Don Simpson (1943–1996), American film producer
 Don Simpson (cartoonist) (born 1961), American comic book artist
 Donna Simpson (internet personality) (born 1967)
 Donna Simpson (musician) (born 19??), member of Australian folk rock band The Waifs
 Dorothy Simpson (born 1933), British author
 Douglas Simpson (born 1982), Scottish field hockey forward
 Dudley Simpson (1922–2017), Australian television composer
 Duke Simpson (1927–2021), American baseball player

E 
 Eber Simpson (politician) (1863–1919), American politician
 Eber Simpson (1895–1964), American football player
 Ebony Simpson (died 1992), female Australian murder victim
 Edmund Simpson (1784–1848), English actor and theatre manager
 Edward Simpson (disambiguation), multiple people
 Edward Simpson (forger) (1815–1???), British geologist and forger
 Edward Simpson (naval officer) (1824–1888), officer in the U.S. Navy
 Edward Simpson (cricketer) (1867–1944), English cricketer
 Edward Sydney Simpson (1875–1939), Australian mineralogist and geochemist
 Edward Simpson (governor), Naval commandant and 20th Naval Governor of Guam
 Edward A. Simpson (1892–19??), British World War I flying ace
 Edward H. Simpson (1922–2019), British statistician
 Edwin Simpson (1909–1973), English footballer
 Eli Simpson (1884–1962), British caver and speleologist
 Eliyahu Simpson (1889–1976), rabbi
 Elizabeth Inchbald née Simpson (1753–1821), English novelist, actress and dramatist
 Elizabeth Simpson (biologist) (born 19??), British biologist
 Elliott Simpson (born 1976), English footballer
 Eric Simpson (born 19??), American basketball coach
 Erik Simpson (born 19??), American politician in Idaho
 Ernest Aldrich Simpson (1897–1958), shipping executive; husband of Wallis, Duchess of Windsor
 Evelyn M. Simpson (1885–1963), English literary critic and scholar

F 
 Fiona Simpson (born 1965), Australian politician
 Florence Simpson (1874–1956), British army officer
 Frank Simpson (disambiguation), multiple people
 Frank W. Simpson (1872–1929), America college football coach
 Frank B. Simpson (1883–1966), American architect
 Frank Simpson (British Army officer) (1899–1986), British Army General
 Frank Simpson (cricketer) (1909–1992), British Army officer and cricketer
 Fred, Freddy and Frederick Simpson (disambiguation), multiple people
 Fred Simpson (politician) (1886–1939), British Labour Party politician, MP for Ashton-under-Lyne 1935–1939
 Freddy Simpson (1883 – after 1907), English footballer for Lincoln City
 Frederick Simpson (athlete) (1878–1945), Canadian long distance runner
 Frederick Simpson (boxer) (1916–1975), British boxer

G 
 Gary Simpson (footballer born 1959), English footballer
 Gary Simpson (footballer born 1961), English footballer and manager
 Garry Simpson (1914–2011), American director, writer and producer
 Geoff Simpson (born 19??), American politician in Washington State
 Geoffrey Simpson (born 19??), Australian cinematographer
 George Simpson (disambiguation), several people including:
 Sir George Simpson (administrator) (c. 1792–1860), explorer and administrator of the Hudson's Bay Company
 George Buchan Simpson (1820–1892), Scottish art collector, connoisseur and patron of Scottish painters
 George Bowen Simpson (1838–1915), politician and judge in New South Wales, Australia
 George Simpson (Canadian politician) (1858–1906), politician in Prince Edward Island, Canada
 George W. Simpson (1870–1951), New York politician and judge
 George Simpson (footballer, born 1876) (1876–1955), English football player for Doncaster Rovers and Chesterfield
 George Simpson (meteorologist) (1878–1965), meteorologist for Scott's Antarctic expedition
 George Goodman Simpson (1896–1990), Australian flying ace
 George Gaylord Simpson (1902–1984), American paleontologist
 George Simpson (sprinter) (1908–1961), American runner
 George Simpson, Baron Simpson of Dunkeld (born 1942), British politician
  Gerald Simpson (born 1967) a British musician known as A Guy Called Gerald and former member of 808 State
 Gerard Simpson (1886–1957), Scottish cricketer for Kent and Argentina
 Gerry Simpson (born 19??), Scottish-born Australian law professor
 Gil Simpson (born 1948), New Zealand businessman
 Gilbert Murray Simpson (1869–1954), English architect based in Brighton
 Glenn Simpson (field hockey) (born 1987), Australian hockey player
 Glenn R. Simpson, American journalist and political researcher
 Gord Simpson (1928–2019), Canadian ice hockey player
 Gordon Simpson (Australian politician) (1929–2017), Australian politician
 Gordon Simpson (judge) (1894–1987), Justice of the Supreme Court of Texas
 Gordon Simpson (rugby union) (born 1971), New Zealand-born rugby player
 Grace Simpson (1920–2007), British archaeologist

H 
 Habbie Simpson (1550–1620), Scottish piper
 Hack Simpson (Harold Alfred Simpson, 1910–1978), Canadian ice hockey player
 Harold Simpson (cricketer) (1879–1924), English cricketer
 Harold Bullet Joe Simpson (1893–1973), Canadian ice hockey player
 Harry Simpson (disambiguation), multiple people
 Harry Simpson (1925–1979),  American baseball player
 Harry Simpson (footballer, born 1869), Scottish footballer for Stoke
 Harry Simpson (English footballer) (born 1875), English footballer for Crewe Alexandra and Stoke
 Harry Simpson (footballer, born 1888), Scottish footballer for Leicester Fosse
 Harvey Simpson (1862–1928), Canadian politician in Manitoba
 Hazel Simpson née Robson (born 1979), British Paralympian athlete
 Heather Simpson (disambiguation), multiple people
 Helen Simpson (disambiguation), multiple people
 Helen Macdonald Simpson (1890–1960), New Zealand teacher, university lecturer and writer
 Helen de Guerry Simpson (1897–1940), Australian novelist
 Helen Simpson (author) (born 1959), British short story writer
Heli Simpson, Australian actress and singer
 Henry Simpson (disambiguation) multiple people
 Henry Simpson (shipping) (1815–1884), merchant and ship owner in South Australia
 Henry Lakin Simpson (1859–1881), United States Navy sailor and Medal of Honor recipient
 Henry Simpson (Toronto) (1864–1926), architect active in Toronto, Ontario
 Henry Simpson (Poets' Club founder) (died 1939), London banker
 Herbert Simpson, English footballer

I 
 Ian Simpson (architect) (born c.1956), English architect
 Ian Simpson (motorcycle racer) (born 1970), Scottish motorcycle road racer
 India Arie Simpson (born 1975), American singer-songwriter, record producer known as India Arie
 Ivan Simpson (1875–1951), Scottish film and theatre actor

J 
 Jack and Jackie Simpson (disambiguation), multiple people
 Jack Simpson (1859–1895), Scottish golfer
 Jack Simpson (1929–2015), Australian politician
 Jackie Simpson (defensive back) (1934–2017), American football defensive back
 Jackie Simpson (linebacker) (1936–1983), American football linebacker
 Jacqueline Simpson (born 1930), British folklorist and author
 Jake Simpson (born 1990), English soccer player
 James Simpson (disambiguation), multiple people
 James Simpson (advocate) (1781–1853), Scottish advocate and author
 James Simpson (civil servant) (c. 1792–1857), early Australian civil servant and property developer
 James Simpson (British Army officer) (1792–1868), general of the British Army
 James Simpson (engineer) (1799–1869), British civil engineer
 James Jenkins Simpson (1881–1936), British zoologist
 James Young Simpson (1811–1870), Scottish doctor and pioneer in use of chloroform as anaesthetic
 James H. Simpson (1813–1883), surveyor of the American West for the U.S. Army
 James Simpson (priest) (1865–1948), Dean of Peterborough, 1928–1942
 James Young Simpson (scientist) (1873–1934), Scottish professor of natural science and diplomat
 James Simpson (Canadian politician) (1873–1938), Canadian trade unionist and mayor of Toronto, 1935
 James Simpson (Australian politician) (1905–1968), member of the New South Wales Legislative Assembly
 James Simpson, Jr. (1905–1960), U.S. Representative from Illinois
 James Simpson (explorer) (1911–2002), British polar explorer
 William James Simpson (born 1954), Australian-American academic commonly known as James Simpson
 James Simpson (government official) (born 19??), US government official
 James B. Simpson (died 2002), US journalist and priest, known for Simpson's Contemporary Quotations
 Jamie Simpson (born 1986), Australian rugby league footballer
 Jane Simpson (disambiguation), multiple people
 Jane Cross Simpson (1811–1886), Scottish hymnist and poet
 Jane Simpson (artist) (born 1965), English artist
 Jane Simpson (footballer) (born 1971), New Zealand international football (soccer) player
 Jane Simpson (solicitor) (born 19??), English lawyer
 Jared Simpson, English rugby league footballer
 Jay Simpson (born 1988), English footballer
 Jeanmarie Simpson (born 1959), American peace activist and theatre and film artist
 Jeff Simpson (born 1950), New Zealand tennis player
 Jeffrey Simpson (born 1949), Canadian journalist
 Jemma Simpson (born 1984), British middle-distance runner
 Jennie Simpson (bowls) (born 19??), New Zealand lawn bowls player
 Jennie Simpson (camogie) (born 1987), Irish camogie player
 Jennifer Simpson (born 1986), American middle-distance runner and steeplechaser
 Jenny Simpson (born 1973), American country music singer
 Jerry Simpson (1842–1905), American politician
 Jesse L. Simpson (1884–1973), American jurist
 Jessica Simpson (born 1980), American pop singer and actress
Jessie L. Simpson (1882–1974), staff member in the United States Senate
 Jim, Jimbo, Jimmi and Jimmy Simpson (disambiguation), multiple people
 Jim Simpson (Australian politician) (1905–1968), member of the New South Wales Legislative Assembly
 Jim Simpson (sportscaster) (1927–2016), American sportscaster
 Jimmy Simpson (footballer, born 1923) (1923–2010), English footballer
 Jimbo Simpson (born 19??), Northern Irish Loyalist terrorist
 Jimmi Simpson (born 1975), American actor
 Jimmy Simpson (American football) (1897–1???), blocking back in the National Football League
 Jimmy Simpson (footballer, born 1908) (1908–1972), Scottish international footballer
 Jimmy Simpson (footballer, born 1923) (1923–2010), English footballer
 Jimmy Simpson (racing driver) (born 1992), American racing driver
 Jock Simpson (1886–1959), English footballer
 Joe Simpson (disambiguation), several people
 Joe Simpson (rugby union, born 1856) (1856–1911), English rugby union player for London Wasps
 Joe Simpson (baseball) (born 1951), American baseball player and broadcaster
 Joe Simpson (mountaineer) (born 1960), English mountaineer and author
 Joe Simpson (artist) (born 1984), English artist best known for cinematic oil paintings
 Joe Simpson (rugby union, born 1988), Australian-born English rugby union player
 John and Johnny Simpson (disambiguation), several people
 John Simpson (Presbyterian) (1740–1808), of South Carolina, in the American Revolutionary War
 John Simpson (Unitarian) (1746–1812), of Bath, English Unitarian minister and religious writer
 John Simpson (soldier) (1748–1825), American Revolutionary War soldier at the Battle of Bunker Hill
 John Simpson (MP for Wenlock) (1763–1850), English politician, Member of Parliament for Wenlock
 John Simpson (artist) (1782–1847) British painter who painted The Captive Slave'''
 John Simpson (Quebec politician) (1788–1873), government official and politician in Quebec
 John Simpson (Canada West politician) (1807–1878), Canadian businessman and politician
 John Palgrave Simpson (1807–1887), British playwright
 John Simpson (Ontario politician) (1812–1885), Ontario banker and member of the Senate of Canada
 John Simpson (VC) (1826–1884), Scottish recipient of the Victoria Cross
 John Woodruff Simpson (1850–1920), American lawyer and founding partner at Simpson Thacher & Bartlett
 John A. Simpson (1854–1916), Canadian politician
 Sir John William Simpson (1858–1933), English architect
 Sir John Hope Simpson (1868–1961), English administrator in India
 John Thomas Simpson (1870–1965), Conservative member of the Canadian House of Commons
 John Simpson Kirkpatrick (1892–1915), Australian World War I war hero of "Simpson and his donkey"
 John Baird Simpson (1894–1960), Scottish geologist
 John Milton Bryan Simpson (1903–1987), American judge
 John Herbert Thomas Simpson (1907–1967), senior RAF officer and Commandant Royal Observer Corps
 John Wistar Simpson (1914–2007), American electrical engineer
 John Alexander Simpson (1916–2000), American physicist
 John Simpson (footballer, born 1918) (1918–2000), English footballer for Huddersfield Town and York City
 John Simpson (British Army officer) (1927–2007), British Army officer and Director SAS
 John Simpson (fencer) (1927–2016), Australian Olympic fencer
 John Simpson (police official) (1932–2017), former director of US Secret Service and Interpol
 John Simpson (footballer, born 1933) (1933–1993), English footballer for Lincoln City and Gillingham
 John Simpson (priest) (1933–2019), Anglican clergyman
 John Simpson (journalist) (born 1944), British BBC journalist, foreign correspondent and author
 John B. Simpson (born 1947), American president of the University at Buffalo
 John Simpson (journalist/consumer advocate) (born 1948), American consumer rights advocate
 John Simpson (lexicographer) (born 1953) English Chief Editor of the Oxford English Dictionary
 John Simpson (architect) (born 1954), British modern-day classical architect
 John L. Simpson (born 1963), Australian film and theatre producer, writer and distributor
 John Simpson (boxer) (born 1983), Scottish featherweight boxer
 John Simpson (English cricketer) (born 1988), English cricketer
 John Simpson (basketball) (born 19??), British basketball player
 Johnny Simpson (1922–2010), New Zealand rugby union international
 Jordan Simpson (Australian footballer) (born 1985), Australian soccer player
 Joseph Simpson (disambiguation), several people
 Joseph Simpson (artist, printmaker) (1879–1939), British painter and etcher
 Sir Joseph Simpson (politician) (1908–1994), British-born Ugandan politician and businessman
 Sir Joseph Simpson (police officer) (1909–1968), Commissioner of the London Metropolitan Police, 1958–1968
 Josh Simpson (disambiguation), several people
 Josh Simpson (glass artist) (born 1949), American glass artist
 Josh Simpson (Canadian soccer) (born 1983), Canadian soccer player
 Josh Simpson (English footballer) (born 1987), English footballer
 Josh Simpson (Australian footballer) (born 1994), Australian rules footballer

 K 
 Kade Simpson (born 1984), Australian rules footballer
 Karen Simpson (born 1975), Canadian actress and fashion designer
 Karl Simpson (born 1976), English footballer
 Keith Simpson (disambiguation), multiple people
 Keith Simpson (professor) (1907–1985), British pathologist
 Keith Simpson (politician) (born 1949), British politician, Conservative MP for Broadland
 Keith Simpson (American football) (born 1956), American football safety
 Ken Simpson (1938–2014), Australian ornithologist
 Kenneth F. Simpson (1895–1941), American politician
 Kent Simpson (ice hockey, born 1975), Canadian ice hockey left winger 
 Kent Simpson (ice hockey, born 1992), Canadian ice hockey goaltender
 Kimberly Hart-Simpson (born 1987), Welsh actress and businesswoman
 Ko Simpson (born 1983), American footballer

 L 
 Lee Simpson (born 19??), British actor and comedian
 Leonard Jennett Simpson (1882–1940), Canadian politician
 Les Simpson (1894–1968), Australian farmer, soldier and soldier-settlement administrator
 Lilian Simpson (1871–1897), British artist
 Lorena Simpson, Brazilian dance-pop singer
 Louis Simpson (1923–2012), Jamaican-born American poet
 Luke Simpson (born 1994), English footballer
 Lynn Simpson (born 1971), British slalom canoer

 M 

 Maggie Simpson (musician) (born 19??), American singer-songwriter
 Malcolm Simpson (1933–2020), New Zealand Olympic cyclist
 Margaret Simpson (born 1981), Ghanaian heptathlete
 Mark Simpson (disambiguation), multiple people
 Mark Simpson (soccer) (born 1966), American soccer player
 Mark Simpson (Ireland correspondent) (born c.1968), journalist and BBC Ireland correspondent
 Mark Simpson (comics) (born 1972), British comic artist under the pseudonym "Jock"
 Mark Simpson (clarinetist) (born 1988), winner of the BBC Young Musician of the Year, 2006
 Mark Simpson (journalist) (born 19??), British journalist, broadcaster and author
 Martin Simpson (geologist) (1800–1892), British geologist
 Martin Simpson, English singer/songwriter and guitarist
 Martin I. Simpson (born 19??), English paleontologist
 Marty Simpson (baseball), 19th-century baseball player
 Marty Simpson (comedian) (born 1972), American comedian and actor
 Mary Simpson (disambiguation), multiple people
 Mary Elizabeth Simpson (1865–1948), New Zealand religious teacher, healer and writer
 Mary Simpson (Episcopal priest) (1925–2011), one of the first women to be ordained
 Mary Simpson (Northern Ireland politician), Unionist politician in Northern Ireland
 Mary Simpson (violinist), American violinist in Yanni's orchestra
 Matt Simpson (disambiguation) multiple people, including
 Matt Simpson (poet) (1936–2009), British poet and literary critic
 Matt Simpson (beer judge) (20th-century), American beer judge
 Matt Simpson (racing driver) (born 1981), British racing driver
 Matt Simpson, American politician and member of the Alabama House of Representatives
 Matthew Simpson (1811–1884), American bishop of the Methodist Episcopal Church
 Matthew Simpson (footballer) (born 1967), Australian rules footballer
 Michael Simpson (disambiguation), Michael, Mickey and Mike Simpson, multiple people
 Michael Simpson (footballer) (born 1974), English football player
 Michael Simpson (producer), record producer and member of the electronic group Dust Brothers
 Mickey Simpson (1913–1985), American TV and film actor
 Mike Simpson (American football) (born 1947), American football player
 Mike Simpson (born 1950), U.S. congressman from Idaho
 Mike Simpson (Michigan politician) (1962–2009), member of the Michigan House of Representatives
 Mike Simpson (writer) (born 19??), British writer and educator
 M. J. Simpson (Mike, born 19??), British movie journalist, author and screenwriter
 Milward L. Simpson (1897–1993), American politician, Governor of Wyoming
 Minnie Cravath Simpson (1860–1945) African-American anti-lynching activist
 Mona Simpson (born 1957), American novelist
Monica Simpson, American reproductive rights activist

 N 
 Nate Simpson (born 1954), American football running back
 Neil Simpson (born 1961), Scottish footballer
 Neil Simpson (boxer) (born 1974), English boxer
 Neil Simpson (alpine skier), British alpine skier
 Nichola Simpson (born 1956), British archer
 Nicole Brown Simpson (1959–1994), murder victim, ex-wife of O. J. Simpson
 Nigel Simpson (born 1975), Samoan-English rugby union player
 Norm Simpson (1905–1990), Australian rules footballer
 N. F. Simpson (Norman F. Simpson, 1919–2011), British playwright

 O 
 O. J. Simpson, American football player, actor, acquitted of murdering his ex-wife
 Oramel H. Simpson, American politician
 Owen Simpson (born 1943), English footballer

 P 
 Pascal Simpson (born 1971), Swedish footballer
 Paul Simpson (disambiguation), multiple people
 Paul Hardrock Simpson (1904–1978), American ultra distance runner
 Paul Simpson (footballer) (born 1966), English football player and manager
 Paul Simpson (musician) (born 19??), musician, vocalist, lyricist and writer from Liverpool, England
 Peggy Simpson (1913–1994), British actress
 Peter Simpson (disambiguation), Pete and Peter Simpson, multiple people
 Pete Simpson (born 1930), American historian, educator and politician
 Peter Simpson (Native rights activist) (c. 1871–1947), Tsimshian activist for Alaska Native rights
 Peter Simpson (Scottish footballer) (1904/05–1974), Scottish football striker
 Peter Simpson (footballer, born 1940), English footballer who played for Burnley and Bury
 Peter Simpson (writer) (born 1942), member of the New Zealand Parliament
 Peter Simpson (footballer, born 1945), English footballer who played for Arsenal
 Sir Peter Jeffery Simpson (20th-c.), British; president of the Royal College of Anaesthetists
 Philemon Simpson (1819–1895), American politician and lawyer
 Portia Simpson-Miller (born 1945), Jamaican prime minister

 R 
 R. A. Simpson, Australian poet
 Ray Simpson (VC) (1926–1978), Australian recipient of the Victoria Cross
 Ray Simpson (born 1954), lead singer with Village People Rebecca Simpson (footballer) (born 1982), New Zealand international football (soccer) player
 Red Simpson (1934–2016), American country music singer-songwriter
 Reg Simpson (1920–2013), English cricketer
 Reid Simpson (born 1969), Canadian ice hockey player
 Rene Simpson (1966–2013), Canadian tennis player
 Rhona Simpson (born 1972), Scottish field hockey player
 Richard Simpson (martyr) (c. 1553–1588), English Catholic priest, martyred during the reign of Elizabeth I
 Richard F. Simpson (1798–1882), U.S. Representative from South Carolina
 Richard Simpson (writer) (1820–1876), Catholic writer and literary scholar
 Richard Simpson (rugby union) (c.1885–19??), rugby union player who represented Australia
 Richard M. Simpson (1900–1960), US Congressman from Pennsylvania
 Richard Simpson (Scottish politician) (born 1942), Scottish politician
 Richard Simpson (born 1968), New York-based rapper known as Chubb Rock 
 Richard J. Simpson (born 19??), Australian professor of biochemistry
 Rick Simpson (born 19??), American set director
 Rik Simpson (born 19??), British record producer, musician and songwriter
 Robert and Robbie Simpson (disambiguation), multiple people
 Robert Winthrop Simpson (1799–1887), Rear-Admiral of the Chilean Navy, hero of the War of the Confederation
 Robert Simpson (brewer), first mayor of Barrie, Ontario and founder of the Robert Simpson Brewing Company
 Robert Simpson (merchant) (1834–1897), Canadian founder of Simpson's Department Store
 Robert Kirkpatrick Simpson (1837–1921), member of the New Zealand Legislative Council
 Robert Simpson (athlete) (1892–1974), American track and field athlete and coach
 Robert L. Simpson (film editor) (1910–1977), American film editor
 Robert Simpson (Manitoba politician) (1910–1997), member of the Canadian House of Commons
 Robert A. Simpson (1910–1998), Alberta politician in Calgary North Hill
 Robert Simpson (meteorologist) (1912–2014), American meteorologist
 Robert L. Simpson (Mormon) (1915–2003), American general authority of The Church of Jesus Christ of Latter-day Saints
 Robert Simpson (composer) (1921–1997), English composer
 Robert Simpson (Northern Ireland politician) (1923–1997), Northern Irish politician
 Robert B. Simpson (born 1943), New Brunswick politician
 Robert Simpson (cricketer) (born 1962), English cricketer
 Robert Simpson (born 1979) comedian, actor and presenter known as Rufus Hound
 Robert L. Simpson, Jr. (born 19??), American artificial intelligence scientist
 Robbie Simpson (born 1975), Australian rugby league footballer
 Robbie Simpson (born 1985), English footballer
 Robbie Simpson (runner) (born 1991), Scottish mountain and long-distance runner
 Roger Simpson (born 1967), English rugby league footballer
 Roland Simpson (1969–2004), Australian base jumper
 Ron Simpson (1934–2010), English footballer
  Ronald Simpson (1962–2014), British guitarist known as Ronny Jordan
 Ronnie Simpson (1930–2004), Scottish football goalkeeper
 R. A. Simpson (Ronald Albert Simpson, 1929–2002), Australian poet and artist
 Rose Simpson (born 19??), British musician (Incredible String Band) and Mayoress of Aberystwyth
 Russell Simpson (actor) (1880–1959), American character actor
 Russell Simpson (tennis) (born 1954), New Zealand tennis player
 Ruth Simpson (disambiguation), multiple people

 S 
 Sarah Simpson (died 1739), Colonial American executed for the murder of her child
 Scott Simpson (disambiguation), multiple people
 Scott Simpson (golfer) (born 1955), PGA Tour golfer
 Scott Simpson (politician) (born 1959), New Zealand National Party MP
 Scott Simpson (pole vaulter) (born 1979), Welsh pole-vaulter
 Sean Simpson (born 1960),  Canadian ice hockey player and coach
 Sean Simpson (footballer) (born 1970), Australian rules footballer
 Shane Simpson (born 19??), Canadian politician in British Columbia
 Shane Simpson (born 19??), Canadian musician
 Shaun Simpson (wrestler) (born 1966), South African wrestler
 Shaun Simpson (motorcyclist) (born 1988), Scottish motocross racer
 Sherone Simpson, Jamaican athlete
 Sid Simpson (1894–1958), American politician
 Steve Simpson (disambiguation), Stephen and Steve Simpson, multiple people
 Stephen Simpson (writer) (1789–1854), American author
 Stephen Simpson (doctor) (1793–1869), Australian pioneer
 Stephen Simpson (born 1984), South African racing driver
 Steve Simpson (baseball) (1948–1989), Major League Baseball pitcher
 Steve Simpson (wrestler) (born 1963), South African wrestler
 Steve Simpson (rugby league) (born 1979), Australian rugby league player

 T 
 Terry Simpson (born 1938), English footballer
 Terry Simpson (born 1943), Canadian ice hockey player and coach
 Thomas Simpson (disambiguation), multiple people
 Thomas Simpson (composer) (1582–c.1628), English composer
 Thomas Simpson (1710–1761), English mathematician, FRS
 Thomas Simpson (engineer) (1755–1823), a British civil engineer
 Thomas Simpson (explorer) (1808–1840), explorer with the Hudson's Bay Company
 Thomas Simpson (architect) (1825–1908), Scottish architect based in Brighton
 Thomas Simpson (footballer) (1933–2016), Australian footballer
 Tim Simpson (born 1956), American golfer
 Tim Simpson (American football) (born 1969), American football player
 Todd Simpson (born 1973), Canadian ice hockey player
 Tom and Tommy Simpson (disambiguation), multiple people
 Tom Simpson (footballer) (1880–19??), early soccer player
 Tom Simpson (1937–1967), British cyclist
 Tom Simpson (ice hockey) (born 1952), Canadian ice hockey player
 Tom Simpson (musician) (born 1972), Scottish musician, keyboard player for the band Snow Patrol
 Tommy Simpson (footballer) (born 1930), Scottish football defender active in the 1950s
 Tony Simpson (born 1965), Australian politician
 Tyler Simpson (1985–2011), Australian soccer player

 V 
 Valerie Simpson (born 1946), American singer/songwriter, member Ashford & Simpson
 Vi Simpson (born 1946), American politician in Indiana
 Victor Simpson (born 1960), New Zealand rugby union footballer
 Vikki Thorn (née Simpson), member, Australian band The Waifs

 W 
 Wallis Simpson (1896–1986), (Wallis, Duchess of Windsor)
 "Walter Simpson", alias of Arthur Evans (VC) (1891–1936), English Victoria Cross recipient
 Warren Simpson (c.1922–1980), Australian snooker player
 Wayne Simpson (born 1948), American baseball player
Wayne Simpson (ice hockey) (born 1989), American ice hockey player 
 Webb Simpson (born 1985), American professional golfer and 2012 US Open champion
 Wilbur Simpson (1917–1997), American bassoonist
 Will C. Simpson, mayor of Ashland, Kentucky 1936–1940
 Will Simpson (equestrian) (born 1959), American Olympic show jumper
 Will Simpson (comics) (born 19??), Northern Irish comic book illustrator
 William Simpson (portrait artist) (c.1818 – 1872) African American artist and civil right activist
 William Simpson (artist) (1823–1899), Scottish war artist and correspondent
 William Simpson (judge) (1894–1966), Australian Supreme Court judge
 William Simpson (rugby league), rugby league footballer who played in the 1900s, and 1910s
 W. Douglas Simpson (William, 1896–1968), Scottish architecture and archaeology academic and writer
 William Dunlap Simpson (1823–1890), Governor of South Carolina from 1879
 William Gayley Simpson (1892–1991), American racial activist and author
 William Hood Simpson (1888–1980), US general who commanded the US Ninth Army in Europe in World War II
 William John Simpson (1851–1901), journalist and political figure in Quebec
 William Kelly Simpson (1928–2017), American professor emeritus of Egyptology and archaeology
 William James Simpson (born 1954), Australian academic
 William R. Simpson (born 1966), Alaskan chemist
 William T. Simpson (1886–1980), New York politician

 Fictional characters 
The Simpsons
 The Simpson family from American animated television series The Simpsons:
 Abe Simpson
 Bart Simpson
 Homer Simpson
 Lisa Simpson
 Maggie Simpson
 Marge Simpson
 Mona Simpson

 Other 
 Andrew Simpson (Neighbors), from the soap opera Neighbours Archie "Snake" Simpson, in the Degrassi franchise
 Bobby Simpson (Home and Away), soap opera character
 Bonnie, Doug, and Katie Simpson, characters in 1989 American independent coming of age comedy movie She's Out of Control Frank Simpson, fictional supervillain in the Marvel Universe known as Nuke (Marvel Comics)
 Ralph Waldo Simpson, from the American TV sitcom Gimme a Break! Roxanne Simpson, supporting character of Marvel Comics' Ghost Rider Samantha "Sam" Simpson, one of the three main characters of the animated television series Totally Spies! Sophie Simpson, from the soap opera Home and Away''

See also 
 Simson (name)
 Simpsons (department store), Canadian department store chain
 Simpson River, Chilean river
 Simpson River (British Columbia), river in British Columbia
 Simpson River National Reserve, national reserve in southern Chile
 Bryan Simpson United States Courthouse, courthouse and federal government facility in Jacksonville, Florida
 Clara Simpson Three-Decker, historic house in Worcester, Massachusetts
 Hope Simpson Enquiry, British Commission addressing immigration and settlement in British Palestine (1930)
 Ian Simpson Architects, English architecture practice
 Jenny Simpson (album), eponymous country music album
 Robert Simpson Island, in Kiribati, now known as Abemama
 Samuel Simpson House, historic house in Wallingford, Connecticut

References 

English-language surnames
Patronymic surnames
Scottish surnames
Surnames of English origin
Surnames from given names